Thomas Webb may refer to:

 Thomas Webb (Gloucester MP) (c. 1663–1734), English MP for Gloucester
 Thomas Richmond Webb (1663–1731), English politician, MP for Calne, Cricklade and Devizes
 Thomas Webb (Methodist) (1724–1796), British-born Methodist pioneer and missionary in America
 Thomas Webb (priest) (died 1797), Dean of Kilmore
 Thomas Smith Webb (1771–1819), American Masonic author
 Thomas Webb (engraver) (1797–1822), British metal engraver

 Thomas Webb (glassmaker) (1804–1869), founder of Thomas Webb & Sons
 Thomas Webb & Sons, English glass company
 Thomas William Webb (1807–1885), British astronomer
 Thomas Webb (co-operator) (1829–1896), British co-operative movement activist
 Thomas Webb (judge) (1845–1916), Australian barrister and Supreme Court of Victoria judge
 Sir Clifton Webb (politician) (Thomas Clifton Webb, 1889–1962), New Zealand politician and diplomat

 Thomas Llewelyn Webb (born 1978), British social psychologist
 Tom Webb (born 1989), English footballer
 Thomas Webb (artist) (born 1991), British multidisciplinary artist